Colleteria is a genus of flowering plants in the family Rubiaceae. The genus is found in the Caribbean.

Systematics
The genus Colleteria was established in 2003 by renaming two species of Chione. Colleteria is part of the subfamily Cinchonoideae but has not been assigned to a tribe. The genus Chione is currently placed within the tribe Hamelieae and Colleteria could be considered part of this tribe as well but no official decision has been made yet.

Species
Colleteria exserta (DC.) D.W.Taylor - Cuba, Dominican Republic, Haiti
Colleteria seminervis (Urb. & Ekman) D.W.Taylor - Dominican Republic, Haiti, Puerto Rico

References

External links
Colleteria in the World Checklist of Rubiaceae

Rubiaceae genera
Cinchonoideae